Nalla Thomas (2 March 1946 – 19 April 2021) was an Asian Christian and a spiritual personality, who served the Church in Assam and undivided Andhra Pradesh for nearly four decades comprising the seventies through the New millennium.  He used to compose hymns for enhancing spiritual direction. Thomas was an Ecclesiastical administrator of Samavesam of Telugu Baptist Churches Society.

In 2016 on Telangana State Formation Day, Government of Telangana included the name of Thomas among list of 62 awardees of personalities who contributed much in different fields.  Under category of Spiritual Personalities, not only was the name of Thomas included, and there were also two other spiritual personalities comprising Vedic scholar Sri Kodakandla Narasimha Rama Sidhanthi and Islamic scholar Sri Janab Mufti Ajeemuddin Saheb of Jamia Nizamia. The three of them were honored along with 59 others on the occasion by then governor of Telangana, E. S. L. Narasimhan and Chief Minister of Telangana, K. Chandrashekar Rao.

Contribution

Ordination of women priests
Thomas stood for Ordination of women in Protestant denominations and went on to ordain two women during his pastorate in Secunderabad. He was also invited to conclaves of Association of Theologically Trained Women of India during leadership of Smt. Navamani Elia Peter, MCI, The Rev. Florence Deenadayalan, CSI and Smt. Johanna Rose Ratnavathi, AELC.

Vocation promotion
As a member of Board of Governors of near-ecumenical Andhra Christian Theological College in eighties, Thomas was able to provide leadership to his alma mater in matters of seminary administration.  He represented Samavesam of Telugu Baptist Churches on the Board in Secunderabad. He helped youth in congregations to realise their vocational calling and prepare themselves to take up the path of Priesthood.

Ecclesiastical administration
Much of the contribution of Thomas was in undivided Andhra Pradesh. After his return from Assam, he began showing interest in overall leadership of Samavesam of Telugu Baptist Churches, beginning with Youth development and Spiritual development. He then was taken aboard the leadership of STBC as Associate General Secretary, whose ecclesiastical jurisdiction comprised states of Tamil Nadu and undivided Andhra Pradesh.  He worked closely with other spiritual leaders, comprising The Revds. Suppogu Joseph, STBC, G. Samuel, STBC and Ravela Joseph, STBC.  In 1988, along with leadership of STBC, he visited some churches in United States on invitation of American Baptist International Ministries.  He also spent four months at Charleston Baptist Temple, Charleston, West Virginia (United States) as a guest of its pastor, The Rev. David Fish, ABM.

Scriptural
Some of the Protestant groups had been working towards making sacred Scriptures available in Lambadi language.  Towards this end, the Bible Society of India (BSI) took the initiative to get the translation work done.  This was initially taken up by The Rev. B. E. Devaraj, CSI, who was teaching at Andhra Christian Theological College, then in river town of Rajahmundry.  Later on, The Rev. Lal Singh Lazarus, CSI took onus to continue its translation.  On the other hand, STBC was also involved in ministries among Lambadis through Banjara Development Trust. By this time, The Revds. Robbie and James Francovich of Cooperative Baptist Fellowship were ministering to Lambadis and showed much interest in the progress of the translation work.  When Bible Society of India Andhra Pradesh Auxiliary approached Thomas seeking to release a copy of New Testament in Lambadi language, he unwittingly became part of history when the scripture portion was released on 25 October 1999 at STBC-Centenary Baptist Church, Clock Tower, Secunderabad in the presence of Old Testament Scholars, The Rev. G. Babu Rao, CBCNC and The Rev. G. D. V. Prasad, CSI, the former being auxiliary secretary of the Bible Society of India Andhra Pradesh Auxiliary and the latter, a translations director of BSI.  Also present was Sri Bidyut Kumar Pramanik, then General Secretary of the BSI.

Early life, education and spirituality

Telangana
For early schooling, Thomas studied in Jangaon at STBC-Preston Institute, which was known for imparting good education,.  Then for collegiate studies, he moved to Secunderabad for Pre-university course at OU-Arts and Science College, Secunderabad (now Postgraduate College, Secunderabad).

Andhra Pradesh
Thomas discerned his calling towards spirituality and approached Samavesam of Telugu Baptist Churches, which considered his candidature and usability for Christian ministry.  This was the time when The Revds. Louis F. Knoll, ABM, Maurice Blanchard, ABM and Tracy Greer Gipson, ABM were leading theological education.  For spiritual formation, Thomas enrolled in near-ecumenical Andhra Christian Theological College, Rajahmundry, studying between 1967 and 1970 for an L. Th. programme during Principalship of Old Testament Scholar, The Rev. W. D. Coleman, AELC.  His study companions included The Rev. D. J. Jeremiah, CBCNC and The Rev. B. J. Christie Kumar, STBC. It was in ACTC that Thomas could interact with Methodists, Lutherans, Baptists, Anglicans, Congregationalists, Presbyterians and Wesleyans.  After completing ministerial studies in Rajahmundry, he reported back to Deccan Association of Samavesam of Telugu Baptist Churches.

During ensuing convocation of Senate of Serampore College (University) held in 1971, which was led by its Registrar, The Rev. Chetti Devasahayam, CBCNC, Thomas was awarded an L. Th. degree.

Madhya Pradesh
In 1973, Thomas moved to Madhya Pradesh, where he spent two years to upgrade his studies at Leonard Theological College, Jabalpur, an institution managed by Methodist Church in India, where he studied in a near-ecumenical setting comprising many of the Protestant denominations and the Orthodox Church. Then Principal, The Rev. John Radhakrishan, MCI led the faculty that included The Revds. Saiyyad Mohammed Zahir Ahsan, MCI, D. V. Singh, MCI, Cariappa Samuel, MCI, S. K. Parmar, MCI, to name a few.

During 1976 convocation of Senate of Serampore College (University), Thomas received the degree of B. D. from Registrar, The Rev. Johannes Thoft Krogh, NELC.

Special studies in Biblical languages
As a Seminarian in Rajahmundry between 1967 and 1970, Thomas evinced interest in learning Biblical Greek and Biblical Hebrew. He displayed Cognitive skills in language learning.  He came under the direct influence of Old Testament's Master Scholar, The Rev. Victor Premasagar, CSI, a Cambridge Tripos along with The Revds. K. David, CBCNC and Muriel Spurgeon Carder, CBM, who taught Biblical Greek.  In 1969, the faculty at the seminary was enriched by the inclusion of The Revds. M. Victor Paul, AELC and Suppogu Joseph, STBC, who were subject experts in New Testament.

When Thomas spent time in Jabalpur from 1973 to 1974, upgrading his studies to BD, he continued his zeal for Biblical languages, learning Biblical Greek and Biblical Hebrew under a different Scholarly team there.  In 1975, he moved to Jangaon to lead a congregation.  During this time, Andhra Christian Theological College (ACTC) moved from Rajahmundry to Secunderabad.  Thomas continued his rendezvous in keeping his learning endeavour active with continued visits to ACTC, Secunderabad to keep in tune with Biblical languages under The Rev. Victor Premasagar and The Rev. K. David, which then resulted in Thomas attempting University papers, that could get him to pursue a postgraduate course in Biblical studies in United Theological College, Bangalore. Somehow, fate willed otherwise, and Thomas continued pastoring in Jangaon.

Career

Assam
When Thomas completed his spiritual formation period, he was sent by STBC in 1970 to Maligaon in Guwahati, Assam, where he pastored a Telugu-speaking congregation for two years.  Telugu Baptist Church in Maligaon was a branch of Guwahati Baptist Church under aegis of Council of Baptist Churches in Northeast India, which catered to Spiritual needs of railway employees hailing from undivided Andhra Pradesh. In 1972 he left Guwahati to take up a special course under aegis of National Council of Churches in India.

Telangana

During latter half of Seventies, Thomas was assigned a pastoral role in Jangaon in STBC-Unruhpura Centenary Baptist Church, in which he served for a decade between 1975 to 1984.

In the nineties, after Old Testament scholar Gaddala Solomon stepped down as pastor of STBC-Centenary Baptist Church, there was an intermittent gap, which was filled by Pastor P. Jyothi Solomon, STBC. By this time, the lack of a strong Pastor was felt much by Church leadership in Secunderabad, which then began considering the name of Thomas for taking up role of Pastor.  In 1991, Thomas moved from Jangaon to Secunderabad to steer the Church.  Gradually, Thomas built up the Church in coordination with its leadership providing much required succor in terms of spiritual development and expanding its missions across twin cities and other locations. Pastorate of Thomas in Secunderabad coincided with archbishopric of Samineni Arulappa, Marampudi Joji and Thumma Bala.

Kuki people have acknowledged the endeavour of leadership of Centenary Baptist Church and pastor Thomas in providing space for hosting their worship in Kuki language. As Pastor, he also stood strong for Youth development, leading to an all-India gathering of youth for a get-together in Secunderabad in 1992, which transformed itself into Baptist Youth Fellowship, India.

References

Further reading

Indian Baptist ministers
20th-century Indian Christian clergy
20th-century Indian translators
People from Telangana
Telugu people
Senate of Serampore College (University) alumni
Osmania University alumni
1946 births
2021 deaths
Christian revivalists
Christian philosophers
Indian spiritual teachers
Indian spiritual writers
Spiritual teachers
Indian Christian missionaries
21st-century Indian Christian clergy
Leonard Theological College alumni